The temple of Baba Bhole Peer is a temple in memory of an old Sufi saint. It is located in Nawa Pind Shonkia Da, Punjab, India.

Bhole Peer da mela 

The festival of Bhole Peer is a mela held on 13 Haad. This festival will fall somewhere in the middle of May in the Christian calendar. It is a famous annual event here, which has seen many renowned Punjabi singers performing, including Hans Raj Hans.

References

Sufi shrines in India
Jalandhar district
Religious buildings and structures in Punjab, India